Emily Climbs is the second in a series of novels by Lucy Maud Montgomery. It was first published in 1925.
While the legal battle with Montgomery's publishing company (L.C. Page) continued, Montgomery's husband Ewan MacDonald  continued to suffer clinical depression. Montgomery, tired of writing the Anne series, created a new heroine named Emily. At the same time as writing, Montgomery was also copying her journal from her early years. The biographical elements heavily influenced the Emily trilogy.

Introduction 

The poem To the Fringed Gentian was the keynote of Montgomery's every aim and ambition. Like Montgomery, Emily climbs the symbolic "Alpine path" to be a female writer.

"The Flash" is an extraordinary experience common to both Montgomery and Emily, but not shared with Anne Shirley.

Plot summary
Emily Byrd Starr longs to attend Queen's Academy to earn her teaching licence, but her tradition-bound relatives at New Moon refuse. She is instead offered the chance to go to Shrewsbury High School with her friends, on two conditions. The first is that she board with her disliked Aunt Ruth, but it is the second that causes Emily difficulties. Emily must not write (aside from schoolwork) during her high-school education. At first, Emily refuses the offer, unable to contemplate a life without any writing. Cousin Jimmy changes the condition slightly, saying that she cannot write anything that is not true, meaning she must not write stories for the duration of her high school education. Emily does not think this much of an improvement but it turns out to be an excellent exercise for her budding writing career. 

Emily clashes with the ever-suspicious Aunt Ruth, who must know all but rarely believes it. After more than a year of Aunt Ruth's disrespect and arbitrariness, Emily walks the seven miles back to New Moon in the dead of night, only to walk back after fully venting her feelings to Cousin Jimmy. 

Emily's friendship with Ilse Burnley is tested by Evelyn Blake, the school's would-be writer, who is jealous and condescending. Emily vanquishes her once and for all when she finds physical proof that Evelyn plagiarized an old poem to win a school contest. Rather than tell everyone about it, Emily only shows the evidence to Evelyn who admits she did it so her father would allow her to take a trip to Vancouver if she won.

Thanks to Aunt Elizabeth's ban on writing fiction, Emily starts to develop her powers of storytelling, writing 'portraits' of people and keeping a journal diligently. Through a series of adventures, Emily is furnished with materials to write stories and poems, and even sees monetary success with the short story "The Woman Who Spanked the King," as told to her by an addled Scottish woman.

In the meantime, Emily also begins to see romantic possibilities for her life. She and Teddy Kent draw closer, but due to misunderstandings and interference from Teddy's jealous mother, the romance stalls. Emily refuses a proposal from her childhood friend Perry Miller, and her cousin Andrew, but continues her long-lasting friendship with Dean Priest.

At the end of the novel, Emily, now a budding young writer, is offered the opportunity to move to New York with the famous writer Janet Royal to jumpstart her career. After much thought and hesitation, Emily chooses to remain at her beloved New Moon, intent on finding fame her own way.

Series

Adaptations

Television series 
The novels were adapted into a TV series by Salter Street Films and CBC Television in 1998.

Animation 
In 2007, Japanese educational TV broadcast "Kaze no Shoujo Emily" which was inspired by the novels.

Musical 
The Gateway Theatre in Richmond played the musical Emily.

References

External links
 
 Online text of Emily Climbs (Project Gutenberg)
 
 L.M. Montgomery Online Formerly the L.M. Montgomery Research Group, this site includes a blog, extensive lists of primary and secondary materials, detailed information about Montgomery's publishing history, and a filmography of screen adaptations of Montgomery texts. See, in particular, the page about Emily Climbs.
 Emily Starr An L.M. Montgomery Resource Page
 Emily of New Moon Debuts on Canadian Television
 Emily of New Moon Official Website of NHK
 Playbill News: Canada's Emily, of New Moon, Sings Again in Revised Musical Revival
 The L.M. Montgomery Literary Society This site includes information about Montgomery's works and life and research from the newsletter, The Shining Scroll.

1925 Canadian novels
New Canadian Library
Novels by Lucy Maud Montgomery
Canadian children's novels
Novels about orphans
Novels set in Prince Edward Island
1925 children's books
Frederick A. Stokes Company books